The International Association of Judges (IAJ) is a professional, non-political, international organization of national associations of judges. It was founded in Salzburg in 1953 and has its headquarters in Rome.

The IAJ promotes the Rule of Law and the Independence of the Judiciary. Its members consist of national associations or representative groups from approximately 90 countries. The IAJ board has eight members from all continents and its main instance is the central council with all its 90 countries. It adopted a new Universal Charter of the Judge at its annual meeting in 2017 which took place that year in Santiago Chile.

The IAJ is the oldest and most prestigious international organization of judges. It is focused on judicial independence as a guarantee of human rights, and in this capacity holds consultant status with the Council of Europe, the International Labor Organization and ECOSOC. The association works also with judicial education with four study commissions on constitutional law, civil, criminal and labor law.

References 

1953 establishments in Austria
Professional associations based in Austria
Professional associations based in Italy